Helen M. Bronte-Stewart is a neurologist and an assistant professor of neurology and neurological sciences at Stanford University. She is also the director of the Stanford Movement Disorders Center.

Education and career 
She studied mathematics and physics at the University of York before earning a master's degree in bioengineering from the University of Pennsylvania. She then obtained a medical degree from the Perelman School of Medicine. She was promoted to an associate professorship in December 2006. Bronte-Stewart later held the John E. Cahill Family Professorship, first held by William C. Mobley. Her research focuses on the pathophysiology of Parkinson's Disease and other movement disorders.

Personal life 
Bronte-Stewart is a former professional dancer.

References

External links 

Living people
Year of birth missing (living people)
Perelman School of Medicine at the University of Pennsylvania alumni
Alumni of the University of York
Stanford University faculty
University of Pennsylvania School of Engineering and Applied Science alumni